Taşkent railway station is a railway station in the Mersin Province of Turkey, on the Adana-Mersin railway. Though legally located within the Dikilitaş neighborhood of Mersin, the station is just east of the city. TCDD Taşımacılık operates daily regional train service from Mersin to Adana, İskenderun and İslahiye, with a total of 24 daily trains stopping at Taşkent, in each direction.

Taşkent station has two side platforms serving two tracks.

References

External links
TCDD Taşımacılık
Taşkent station in Google Street View

Buildings and structures in Mersin
Railway stations in Mersin Province
Transport in Mersin